Anglin Lake is an unincorporated community in the central region of the Canadian province of Saskatchewan. The community is located on the eastern shore of Anglin Lake and is surrounded by Great Blue Heron Provincial Park.

See also 
List of communities in Saskatchewan

References 

Lakeland No. 521, Saskatchewan
Unincorporated communities in Saskatchewan
Division No. 15, Saskatchewan